The Khotyn Fortress is a fortification complex located on the right bank of the Dniester River in Khotyn, Chernivtsi Oblast (province) of western Ukraine. It is situated on a territory of the historical northern Bessarabia region which was split in 1940 between Ukraine and Moldova. The fortress is also located in a close proximity to another famous defensive structure, the Old Kam'yanets Castle of Kamianets-Podilskyi. Construction on the current stone Khotyn/Hotin fortress was started in 1375, while major improvements were made in the 1380s and in the 1460s, under the Moldavian princes, Alexander the Good, and Stephen the Great.

History

As a Rus' stronghold 

The Khotyn Fortress' beginning goes back to the Khotyn Fort, which was built in the 10th century by Prince Volodymyr Sviatoslavovych as one of the border fortifications of southwestern Kievan Rus', after he added the land of present-day Bukovina to his control. The fort, which eventually was rebuilt a fortress, was located on important commerce routes, which connected Scandinavia and Kyiv with the Ponyzia (lowlands), Podillia, Genoese and Greek colonies on the Black Sea, through Moldavia and Wallachia, on the famous "trade route from the Varangians to the Greeks".

The fortification was located on a rocky territory, created by the tall right-hand shore of the Dniester and the valley. At first it was just a huge mound of dirt with wooden walls and protective equipment. It was designed to protect the settlement of Khotyn across the river. The first stone construction was rather small. It was located exactly where the northern tower is located today. Throughout the centuries, this fortress underwent many reconstructions and expansions, and was damaged by new conquerors, who would later rebuild it.

At the end of the 11th century, Khotyn fortress belonged to Terebovlia principality. During the 1140s the fortress became part of Halych Principality, and in 1199 was part of the Halych-Volhynian Kingdom.

Reconstruction and fortification 

In 1250–64, Prince Danylo of Halych and his son Lev, rebuilt the fortress. In the northern part of the fortress, were added new military buildings as well. In the second half of the 13th century, it was rebuilt by the Genoese.

During the 1340s the Fortress was taken by Moldavian prince Dragos, a vassal of the Kingdom of Hungary. After 1375 it was a part of the Principality of Moldavia. Under the rule of Alexander the Good, and then Stephen the Great of Moldavia the old fortress was rebuilt from stone and greatly expanded, to its actual form. The courtyard was divided into princes' and soldiers' halves. He also dug deep basements which served as barracks to soldiers. This reconstruction brought the fortress to the structure it has today. During 14th-16th centuries the Fortress served as a residence to Moldavian Princes.

In 1476, the garrison successfully held the Fortress against the Turkish army of Sultan Mehmed II. By the end of the 16th century Moldavia became a tributary principality of the Ottoman Empire. Thereafter, a janissary unit was stationed inside the fortress, alongside the Moldavian troops. During this time the Turks expanded and fortified the Fortress.

The Fortress was captured by the Polish–Lithuanian Commonwealth forces under the leadership of Great Crown Hetman Jan Tarnowski in 1538. Commonwealth forces undermined the walls of the Fortress, destroyed three towers and part of the western wall. After it was captured, the Khotyn Citadel was renovated between 1540 and 1544. In 1563 Dmytro Vyshnevetsky with five hundred Zaporozhian Cossacks captured the Fortress and held it for a time.

17th to 19th centuries

In 1600 father of Petru Movilă, Simion, the previous ruler of both Moldavia and Wallachia, and his brother Prince of Moldavia Ieremia Movilă, with Polish support, took refuge in the Fortress. They fought a dynastic battle against the forces of Moldavia and Wallachia led by Michael the Brave, who was trying to capture it, then took refuge to Poland.

In 1611 Voivode Stefan Tomsa II ruled Moldova with the support of the Ottoman Empire and held Khoytn Fortress until he was deposed in 1615.

In 1615 the Polish army again captured Khotyn, but ceded it back to the Turks in 1617. In 1620 the city was again captured by the Polish army.

In September–October 1621, the Commonwealth army under command of hetman Jan Karol Chodkiewicz and Petro Sahaidachny, Yatsko Borodavka (about 50,000 troops) successfully held off the army of the Turkish sultan, Osman II (estimated at 100,000), in the Battle of Khotyn. On October 8, 1621, the Khotyn Peace Treaty was signed, stopping the Ottoman advance into the Commonwealth and confirming the Commonwealth-Ottoman border on the Dniester river (the border of the Principality of Moldavia), thus ceding Khotyn back to Moldavia as a vassal of Ottoman empire.

Bohdan Khmelnytsky, came first as an ally of Principalities of Moldavia and Wallachia, then occupied the Khotyn Fortress for a period of time in the spring of 1650. In 1653, in the Zhvanets Battle on the left bank of Dniester, a garrison of Turks from Khotyn were fighting in the battle along with the forces of the Principality of Moldavia. In November 1673, the Khotyn Fortress was lost by the Turks and Jan Sobieski started to occupy Khotyn with a Polish-Cossack army. Jan Sobieski is known to have described the battle as "More than 60 guns were thundering non-stop, the sky was in flames and smothered in smoke, the earth was quaking, the walls were groaning, the rocks were splitting into pieces. That which my eyes captured throughout the day was indescribable. It is impossible to convey the persistence and courage, or rather despair, with which both parties were fighting".

In early August 1674 the fortress was captured back bu Turkish forces; Jan Sobieski, by then the Polish king, recaptured it in 1684.

With the 1699 Karlowitz Peace Treaty, the fortress was transferred from the Polish–Lithuanian Commonwealth to Moldavia. In 1711, Khotyn was again taken over by the Turks. The Turks then fortified Khotyn following a six-year (1712–18) reconstruction and it became the foremost stronghold of the Ottoman defence in Eastern Europe.

In 1739, after the Russians defeated the Turks in the Battle of Stavuchany (today Stavceane) in which Ukrainians, Russians, Georgians, and Moldavians fought, they laid siege on the Khotyn fortress. The commander of the Turkish forces, Iliaş Colceag surrendered the fortress to the Russian commander Burkhard Christoph von Münnich.

In 1769 and 1788, the Russians again successfully stormed the fortress, but every time it was given back according to peace treaties. Only after the Russo-Turkish War (1806-1812) did Khotyn become a permanent part of Russia and a district center in Bessarabia. However, when the Turks were retreating, they almost completely ruined the fortress.

In 1826, the city of Khotyn was given a coat of arms.

In 1832, the new church of Oleksandr Nevskiy was built on the territory inside of the fortress.

In 1856, the government ended the status of the Khotyn Fortress as a military entity.

20th and 21st centuries 

The First World War and the Russian Civil War took a heavy toll on the people of Hotin. In January 1918, the Moldovan Democratic Republic proclaimed its independence and in March, united with Romania.

In January 1919, an anti-Romanian uprising took place orchestrated by the bolsheviks from Russia. The Hotin Directory gained authority in more than one hundred villages in the area and Y. I. Voloshenko-Mardaryev (Й. І. Волошенко-Мардар'єв) was in charge. The uprising lasted only ten days and on February 1, the Romanians got into Hotin. Hotin was internationally recognized as part of Romania after the Paris Peace Conference, remaining a part of Romania for 22 years, being the administrative center of the Hotin County.

On 28 of June 1940, Soviet Union occupied Bessarabia and Northern Bukovina and at the orders of Moscow, the northern part of Bessarabia, including the town of Hotin was incorporated into the Ukrainian Soviet Socialist Republic. On July 6, 1941, Hotin was reconquered by the Nazi German-Romanian armies, returning to Romania as part of the Bukovina Governorate. In the summer of 1944, the Red Army reoccupied the region.

In September 1991, during the celebration of 370 years since the Battle of Khotyn of 1621, a monument made in honor of Ukrainian Hetman, Petro Sahaidachnyi by sculptor I. Hamal' (І. Гамаль).
Today, Khotyn is one of the biggest cities and an important industrial, tourist, and cultural center of the Chernivtsi oblast. Taking into consideration the rich historical traditions of the city, the Khotyn fortress architectural prereserve was created by the Cabinet of Ministers of Ukraine in 2000. In September 2002, the ancient city celebrated its 1000-year anniversary.

Khotyn Fortress in films

Many historical adventure movies were filmed in the Khotyn fortress: The Viper (1965), Zakhar Berkut (1971), The Arrows of Robin Hood (1975), Old Fortress (1976), d'Artagnan and Three Musketeers (1978), The Ballad of the Valiant Knight Ivanhoe (1983), The Black Arrow (1985) and Taras Bulba (2009). In these films, the fortress usually represented  various French and English castles, including La Rochelle.

Legends

There are also many legends about the fortress, created over the hundreds of years of its existence. Some popular legends involve the origins of the large dark spot on the side of the wall of the fortress. One legend says that the spot was created by the tears of the Khotyn rebels against the Ottoman Turks that were killed inside the fortress. Another legend has it that the spot was created from the tears of a girl named Oksana, whom the Turks buried alive in the walls of the fort.

Khotyn in art

References

External links 

 Cetatea Hotin — Moldata.com 
 Pictures of Khotyn Fortress on the LiveJournal 
 Video "Khotyn Fortress, aerial survey (4k Ultra HD)"
 Khotyn Fortress screened from a drone.

Buildings and structures completed in the 10th century
Buildings and structures completed in the 14th century
Castles in Ukraine
Castles in Moldavia
Landmarks in Chernivtsi Oblast
Historic sites in Ukraine
Buildings and structures in Chernivtsi Oblast
Tourist attractions in Chernivtsi Oblast
Forts in Ukraine